Noah Crétier (born 14 November 2001) is a French footballer who plays as a defender for San Diego State Aztecs.

Career
Crétier made his professional debut with Nice in a 1–0 UEFA Europa League loss to Hapoel Be'er Sheva on 10 December 2020. In August 2022, he began studying business management at San Diego State University where he would also play college soccer.

Personal life
Crétier is the son of the retired footballer Thierry Crétier.

References

External links
 
 OGC Nice Profile

2001 births
Living people
Footballers from Nice
French footballers
Association football defenders
OGC Nice players
Championnat National 2 players
Championnat National 3 players
French expatriate footballers
Expatriate soccer players in the United States
French expatriate sportspeople in the United States
San Diego State Aztecs men's soccer players